Palo Alto is a town in the Mexican state of Aguascalientes. It serves as the municipal seat for the surrounding municipalities of El Llano.

As of 2010, Palo Alto had a total population of 5,399.

References

External links
http://www.aguascalientes.gob.mx/estado/m_elll.html

Populated places in Aguascalientes